Israeli Song is an album by saxophonist Eli Degibri.

Background and recording
This was Degibri's fifth recording as leader. Most of the tracks are Degibri's originals; the other band members wrote one each. On the title track, "After a slowly unfurling a capella intro, Degibri moves into the gorgeous melody supported by Mehldau's slow chordal accompaniment."

Reception
The Down Beat reviewer observed that, "Though the members of the band shine during their individual solos, the musicians are deferential to Degibri's spirited tenor and soprano playing."

Track listing
"Unrequited"
"Mr. R.C."
"Judy the Dog"
"Jealous Eyes"
"Manic Depressive"
"Bebop"
"Liora"
"Look What You Do To Me"
"Third Plane"
"Somewhere over the Rainbow"
"Israeli Song"

Personnel
 Eli Degibri – tenor sax, soprano sax
 Brad Mehldau – piano
 Ron Carter – bass
 Al Foster – drums

References

2010 albums
Eli Degibri albums